Charles Beresford (1846 – 19 January 1906) was a New Zealand cricketer. He played one first-class match for Taranaki in 1882/83.

Beresford grew up in New South Wales and moved to New Zealand in the 1870s, where he established a business in Normanby, in the Taranaki district, before moving to the Auckland district. He died suddenly while playing cricket in Mangamuka.

See also
 List of Taranaki representative cricketers

References

External links
 

1846 births
1906 deaths
New Zealand cricketers
Taranaki cricketers
Place of birth missing
Australian emigrants to New Zealand